Greenwheels is the largest carsharing corporation in the Netherlands and also operates in Germany. Operations in the United Kingdom ceased on 1 March 2013.

Founded as Collect Car B.V. on 21 June 1995 by Gijs van Lookeren Campagne and Jan Borghuis, who were inspired by car sharing by German students in the 1980s. Now the biggest and most successful carsharing company of the Netherlands, Collect Car B.V., Rotterdam, - better known by its trademark 'Greenwheels' - bought the majority of the shares of StattAuto, a German carsharing company (founded in 1994 as StattAuto Hamburger CarSharing GmbH) in 2004. The car sharing firm received a financial boost by Dutch entrepreneur  in 1997.
By the end of 2005, Greenwheels owned 98.5% of StattAuto shares. Greenwheels also operated in London as Greenwheels UK until 1 March 2013. In April 2013 it was announced that a consortium consisting of the Volkswagen Financial Services AG ( 60% ) and the Dutch VW importer Pon Holdings B.V. ( 40% ) acquired an unspecified amount of shares in CollectCar B.V.

Early 2016, the CarSharing company Quicar in Hannover was acquired by Volkswagen Leasing GmbH. Greenwheels will continue 60 Quicar stations from 1 April 2016 and occupy a total of 80 vehicles of the types VW up !, VW Golf Variant 5th generation and VW Caddy .

Locations

Greenwheels has extensive locations in mostly urban centres in Germany and Netherlands. In the UK, operations were only in the boroughs of Wandsworth and Lambeth, and closed on 1 March 2013 because Greenwheels UK "did not have enough members to continue our services".

Fleet

Greenwheels fleet consists of subcompact (supermini or city car) or compact (compact MPV, leisure vehicles) that are better able to handle the narrow and congested streets found in European cities.

In the Netherlands Greenwheels operates with mostly Volkswagen vehicles, VW up!, Variant and Caddy's:

In Germany Greenwheels uses Volkswagen vehicles:

 VW up!
 VW Golf Variant 5th generation 
 VW Caddy

References

External links

 

Transport in the Netherlands
Transport in England
Transport organisations based in Germany
Carsharing
Transport companies established in 1995
Dutch companies established in 1995